The 1977 Southern Conference men's basketball tournament took place from February 26–March 2, 1977. The quarterfinal round was hosted at campus sites, while the semifinals and finals were hosted at the Roanoke Civic Center in Roanoke, Virginia. The VMI Keydets, led by head coach Charlie Schmaus, won their third Southern Conference title and received the automatic berth to the 1977 NCAA tournament.

Format
All of the conference's seven members were eligible for the tournament. Teams were seeded based on conference winning percentage. The tournament used a preset bracket consisting of three rounds, the first of which featured three games, with the winners advancing to the semifinals.

Bracket

* Overtime game

See also
List of Southern Conference men's basketball champions

References

Tournament
Southern Conference men's basketball tournament
Southern Conference men's basketball tournament
Southern Conference men's basketball tournament
Southern Conference men's basketball tournament